Edu-Ware Services, Inc. was an educational and entertainment software publisher established in 1979 by Sherwin Steffin and Steven Pederson. It was known for its adventure games, role-playing video games, and flight simulators for the Apple II family of computers.

History
Edu-Ware founders Sherwin Steffin and Steven Pederson met at UCLA, where Steffin was working as a faculty advisor to the campus radio station while Pederson worked as a student.  When Steffin was let off from work in the spring of 1979, he and Pederson decided to form a software publishing company specializing in educational software for the Apple II.  In particular, Steffin, who held degrees in experimental psychology and instructional technology, wanted to create computer aided instruction that encouraged divergent thinking, in contrast to current school curriculum, which he believed encouraged convergent thinking.

Working out of his Woodland Hills, California apartment, Steffin programmed educational software, while Pederson favored games. The games he created while completing his studies at UCLA.  Edu-Ware's first products were Perception, followed by Compu-Read, which Steffin had begun programming before starting Edu-Ware, with the intention of selling it to Programma International.  Software store Rainbow Computing, enticed by Pederson's concept for a new role-playing video game called Space, gave him his first Apple II computer, which he used to write the strategy game Terrorist and the educational program Compu-Spell, for which Pederson wrote the first version of Edu-Ware's EWS graphics engine for generating text on the Apple's high-resolution graphics screen.

The company expanded beyond the two founders when it hired Mike Lieberman, who had also worked at the student radio station, as a sales manager, and contracted game developer David Mullich, who met Steffin while working at Rainbow Computing. After writing several games for Edu-Ware as a freelancer, he joined Edu-Ware on completing his studies from California State University, Northridge in 1980, and as his first assignment created the ground-breaking adventure game The Prisoner, the product for which Edu-Ware is best remembered today.  The game was also a financial success for the company, which moved into actual office space, at 22222 Sherman Way in Canoga Park, California, by the year's end. Sometime later, the company relocated to larger facility overlooking the 101 Freeway in Agoura Hills, California.

Edu-Ware may be most noted for what it failed to publish rather than what it did publish: Ken Williams originally shopped the first graphical adventure, Mystery House to Eduware in 1980. Unhappy with how the negotiations were proceeding, he formed On-line Systems to publish the game. On-line Systems became Sierra On-line and Sierra became extremely successful, based largely on their reputation in the graphic adventure genre.

While The Prisoner remained Edu-Ware's best-selling individual product during its first two years of business, educational software remained its primary focus.  The Compu-Math series, consisting of three programs designed by Steffin and programmed by Mullich for teaching elementary mathematics, unveiled Edu-Ware's vision of teaching by objectives and measuring learning through pretesting and post-testing.  The company's educational approach was perfected in 1981 with the release of the first in the Algebra series, in which learners choose the cognitive approach by which they want to learn.  The Algebra series greatly surpassed The Prisoner in sales and became Edu-Ware's greatest source of revenue.   
 
Despite the company's successes, by 1982 it was obvious to Steffin and Pederson that they could not continue running the company themselves.  Rapidly climbing marketing costs and heavier competition from rivals like Davidson & Associates and Spinnaker Software were taking their toll. For the 1.5 million dollar software company to survive, Edu-Ware needed more management strength and expertise.  In July 1983 Management Sciences America, then the world's largest independent software manufacturer, announced that it was purchasing Edu-Ware for a combination of cash and MSA stock, valued at $1.5 million, plus a percentage of future earnings.  Having previously specialized in mainframe computer software, MSA saw the purchase as its entry into educational software, which it saw as a future growth market.

However, the relationship soon soured as Edu-Ware's marketing was taken over by MSA's Peachtree Software accounting software division, and the Edu-Ware brand identity was slowly extinguished.  The final straw came when Personal Computing hit the newsstands in October 1984.  The issue featured a well-publicized peach-scented insert that unfolded into eight pages, 32-inches wide, displaying a shelf of 67 Peachtree Software products, all in identical packaging.  This included 45 Edu-Ware products that were virtually indistinguishable from the accounting software packaging, the only difference being that the Edu-Ware products had the word 'Education' on the box, even for the Edu-Ware games like Prisoner 2.

Steffin's protests over how MSA was handling Edu-Ware caused him to be fired in August 1984.  The next month, he filed a lawsuit against MSA, claiming the company had violated securities laws in making fraudulent representations to Edu-Ware's stockholders in order to buy the latter's stock and for the promise of future payments not materialized.  Steffin further claimed he was to be employed by Edu-Ware for four years after the sale, and charged that MSA undercut Edu-Ware sales to diminish the payments it had promised.  He said MSA sabotaged the company by holding some products off the market, eliminating advertising and discontinuing use of the Edu-Ware name.

Two months after Steffin filed his lawsuit, MSA announced plans to sell its retail microcomputer software group of Peachtree Software, DesignWare, and Eduware, which together lost $2 million that year. MSA cited the millions of dollars Peachtree Software had spent on advertising and promotion, including the expensive peach-scented insert, as a reason for selling off the group.  In March 1985 Encyclopædia Britannica announced that it had purchased Designware and Edu-Ware from MSA for an undisclosed sum.  The EduWare development team was to be disbanded, and DesignWare would handle both the development and marketing of Edu-Ware and Designware products.

Steffin started another software publishing company, BrainPower, along with sales manager Lieberman, while Pederson, who had left Edu-Ware several months earlier, went on to other ventures. Mullich and a few other remaining Edu-Ware employees acquired two of the computer games in development, an adventure game called Wilderness: A Survival Adventure and a space flight simulator called Tranquility Base, and formed their own game company, Electric Transit.

Besides Mullich, another notable Edu-Ware alumni include former Apple Computer evangelist Guy Kawasaki, who was director of marketing at the company, and NASA official Wesley Huntress, who developed Rendezvous: A Spaceflight Simulator.

Products

"Unique software for the unique mind"

Edu-Ware's initial product line was an eclectic mix of analytical software, educational software and computer games, which it marketed under the slogan "unique software for the unique mind".  Its 1979 product listed such titles as the metric conversion calculator Metri-Vert, an E.S.P. program to help determine if users have extrasensory perception, and a drinking game called Zintar.

However, the photocopied documentation that was packaged in a zip-lock bag with each of Edu-Ware's early products outlined the company's goal of creating software that fell into two distinct categories: K-12 educational products that aimed to provide computer aided instruction that went beyond "random drill and practice routines', and entertainment products which were “often more intellectually powerful, and educational, than the educational products themselves".

While many of the company's initial efforts fell short of that vision and were soon dropped from future catalogues, several early products typified the Edu-Ware experience, including its speed reading program Compu-Read, and its science fiction role-playing video game Space.

The science of learning
In 1981, Edu-Ware formalized the distinction between its educational and entertainment products by creating two separate product lines, each with its own packaging.  The "Science of Learning" product line consisted of no-nonsense tutorials such as the Compu-Spell, Compu-Math and Algebra series.  In each, the learner is given specific, measurable learning objectives; then pre-tested to assess current skill levels before being presented with sequenced learning modules; after which he is post-tested to determine what he has learned.  Several of these products featured a classroom management module, which measured the individual progress of an entire classroom of students and provide teacher control over the learning process.

While Edu-Ware's attempts at applying formal learning theory were often praised, its no-nonsense approach to learning had its critics.  For example, a review of Compu-Math: Arithmetic Skills complained that the program is  "devoid of the fun aspect that makes computerized learning human and inspiring.  The sole reinforcement is an ever-increasing complexity of the problems".

Although most of Edu-Ware's Science of Learning products were developed internally, by 1982 the company was attracting outside educators such as Judith S. Priven, Ed.M., who developed several PSAT/SAT products; Neil Bennett, Ph.D., who created an interactive tutorial for teaching BASIC programming; and M. David Merill, who created the first of an unfinished comprehensive series to teach poetry.

Interactive fantasies

While educational software was Edu-Ware's bread and butter, its innovative games are what the company is remembered for today.  The goal of Edu-Ware's games was to "test, challenge and perhaps inspire that closet intellectual in all of us."  Dubbed "Interactive Fantasies", they tackled such weighty topics as the oil crisis (Windfall), television programming (Network), and global terrorism (Terrorist).  Noted one magazine reviewer, "there is that residual element of reality that makes Edu-Ware stuff so good".

Many of Edu-Ware's games were written by game designer David Mullich. The most famous of these was Prisoner 2, an update that added graphics to their earlier game The Prisoner.  The game was Mullich's homage to the Patrick McGoohan 1967 TV series The Prisoner, which had recently been rebroadcast in the United States.  The game was Edu-Ware's most critically acclaimed title, and was ported to the Atari and IBM PC computers.  While the game was one of Edu-Ware's best-selling titles: it proved too outside the mainstream to be considered a true hit.

Interactive simulations
In 1982 Edu-Ware introduced a third brand, Interactive Simulations, when it released Rendezvous: A Space Shuttle Simulation, developed by NASA scientist Wesley Huntress.  Accompanied by a thick "Spacecraft Operations" manual with a chapter on use in the classroom, this flight simulator was marketed as being as educational as it was fun to play but still was able to have been used in an educational setting.

Dragonware
While the typical Edu-Ware educational product adopted a very serious tone in its instruction, developer John Conrad had created a series of educational products such as Introduction to Counting and Spelling and Reading Primer for Edu-Ware that was designed for the younger learner and thus more playful than the typical Edu-Ware product.

However, two of Conrad's later products, Spelling Bee Games and Webster’s Numbers, fell so far into the realm of edutainment that Edu-Ware created a fourth product line for them in 1983.  The Dragonware line featured a dragon mascot named Webster, who was to be the child's companion in this series of educational games.

Peachtree software
Edu-Ware's final products – the comprehensive Learning to Read literacy series, the final chapter in the Empire role-playing video game saga, a Tranquility Base lunar lander simulator, and a children's game called Merry Canned Nightmare’s and Dreams – would each have fit well into its Science of Learning, Interactive Fantasies, Interactive Simulations, and Dragonware brands, respectively.

However, Edu-Ware's new owner, MSA, decided to strip Edu-Ware of all its brands and marketed the entire software line in identical packaging, bearing the logo of its Peachtree Software accounting software division.  All of the products were promoted as being educational software – even such games as Prisoner 2 – until the product line was sold to Encyclopædia Britannica in 1985.

Published titles

References

External links
Edu-Ware Services, Inc. title list — on the Internet Movie Database.

 
 01
 01
Defunct educational software companies
Defunct software companies of the United States
Defunct video game companies of the United States
Software companies based in California
Video game companies based in California
Technology companies based in Greater Los Angeles
Companies based in Agoura Hills, California
American companies established in 1979
Software companies established in 1979
Software companies disestablished in 1985
Video game companies established in 1979
Video game companies disestablished in 1985
1979 establishments in California
1985 disestablishments in California
Defunct companies based in Greater Los Angeles